Leyde Jossy Guerra Mucha (born 27 September 1998) is a Peruvian racewalker. In 2019, she competed in the women's 20 kilometres walk event at the 2019 World Athletics Championships held in Doha, Qatar. She did not finish her race.

In 2018, she won the gold medal in the women's 20 km walk at the 2018 South American Under-23 Championships in Athletics held in Cuenca, Ecuador.

In 2019, she won the bronze medal in the women's 20 km walk at the 2019 South American Championships in Athletics held in Lima, Peru.

She also competed in the women's 20 kilometres walk at the 2020 Summer Olympics held in Tokyo, Japan.

References

External links 
 

Living people
1998 births
Place of birth missing (living people)
Peruvian female racewalkers
World Athletics Championships athletes for Peru
Athletes (track and field) at the 2020 Summer Olympics
Olympic female racewalkers
Olympic athletes of Peru
21st-century Peruvian women